"Run It Up" is a song by American rapper Lil Tjay featuring Offset and Moneybagg Yo. It was released on April 2, 2021 from Lil Tjay's second studio album Destined 2 Win, with an accompanying music video. The song was produced by Josh Petruccio and Rodney Moss.

Composition
The song features a "melancholic piano loop and some up-tempo percussion" in the instrumental. LIl Tjay begins with the first verse, on which he "proves why he's one of the game's standout newcomers", before Offset and Moneybagg Yo rap the second and third verses respectively. The three rap about their individual lifestyles, which involve "foreign cars and blinged-out jewelry".

Music video
The music was directed by Whipalo. It opens with Lil Tjay in a garage, flaunting a "lavish car collection" and his money. As Offset performs his verse, a gray BMW does donuts around him. Moneybagg Yo raps next to some cars as well. In the ending, Lil Tjay "makes it rain in the middle of a blazing fire inside the garage".

Charts

Certifications

References

2021 songs
Lil Tjay songs
Offset (rapper) songs
Moneybagg Yo songs
Songs written by Offset (rapper)
Songs written by Lil Tjay